Clube Atlético Colatinense, commonly known as Colatinense, is a Brazilian football club based in Colatina, Espírito Santo state.

History
The club was founded on October 17, 2005. Colatinense won the Campeonato Capixaba Second Level in 2006.

Achievements

 Campeonato Capixaba Second Level:
 Winners (1): 2006

Stadium
Clube Atlético Colatinense play their home games at Estádio Municipal Justiniano de Melo e Silva. The stadium has a maximum capacity of 12,000 people.

References

Association football clubs established in 2005
Football clubs in Espírito Santo
2005 establishments in Brazil